John Sanderson is an American photographer and artist. He photographs both natural and built environments.

Early life and education 
Sanderson was born in New York City. Describing his earliest visual memories as "looking out the window and feeling fascinated by the landscapes going by", much of his work includes landscapes as something independent of their intended use. He received a degree in political science and his work is rooted in a cultural geography framework. Sanderson was twice awarded a docent scholarship from the Center for Railroad Photography and Art. His railroad landscapes were the subject of a solo exhibition at the New York Transit Museum from September 2014–April 2016. He has photographed broadly since that time, including seven months in Carbon County, Wyoming in 2017.

Photographs 

Sanderson is best known for his boldly printed color photographs made from large format film. While his early work was in black and white, a shift to color printing occurred after he began to photograph exclusively with the large format camera. Transitioning to the large format camera enhanced his photographic process on many levels. The subjects in his photographs range from the urban landscapes of New York City to the High Plains of Wyoming. Underpinning his work is a passion for architectural design.

Sanderson's photographs are captured outdoors. His early photographs documented the industrial landscapes across his native Northeastern United States. Sanderson began to expand his photographic investigation into the broader American landscape in 2009. It was during this trip through the American Midwest when he made the pivotal photograph Steel Mill and Houses, Lackawanna, New York. Sanderson began photographing the American West in 2015 and returned to Wyoming in 2017 where he spent seven months photographing the Carbon County project.

Publications 
 Carbon County Folio Box and Booklet, Zatara Press, 2019
 After Promontory: 150 Years of Transcontinental Railroading, Indiana University Press, 2019
 Issue 4 – John Sanderson: National Character Monograph, Subjectively, Objective, 2018

Exhibitions

Solo exhibitions 
 September 15 – October 22, 2011 – The High Iron: Northeast Railroad Landscapes – Ten43 Gallery, New York, New York
 September 13, 2014 – April 29, 2016 – Railroad Landscapes – New York Transit Museum, Brooklyn, New York 
 January 30, 2017 – February 24, 2017 – American Traditions – Orange Coast College, Costa Mesa, California
 April 8–10, 2016 – CRPA Exhibition: Railroad Landscapes, Glen Rowan House, Lake Forest, Illinois
 April 30 – July 25, 2020 (forthcoming) John Sanderson – The Master Gallery, New York, New York

Group exhibitions, 2008–2015
 All Aboard! Railroads & The Historic Landscapes They Travel – Monmouth Museum, Lincroft, New Jersey
 Joy Wai Gallery Art Talks (curated by Joy Wai and Montgomery Taylor) – United Nations Plaza, New York, New York
 Annual RxArt Auction, Milk Studios, New York, New York
 Hope, Change, Progress: Art Focus for America, New York, New York

2016 
 Royal Photographic Society Touring Exhibition, United Kingdom
 Structures: LoosenArt LAB-A Gallery, 52 Cagliari, Italy, October 1–10
 Man in the Landscape: PhotoPlace Gallery, Middlebury, Vermont, October 5–28
 Tell Me a Story, The B Complex Gallery, Atlanta, Georgia, October 5–18
 WE: AMEricans: Station Independent Projects, New York, New York July 7 – August 7
 Imagined Realities: PhotoPlace Gallery, Middlebury, Vermont, July 6 – August 5
 Dada Lives!: University of Cincinnati Blue Ash Gallery, Blue Ash, Ohio, April 25 – June 36
 Art Now 2016: Photography 2016 – Ann Arbor Art Center, Ann Arbor, Michigan, April 1 – May 14

2017 
 LifeFramer Awards Touring Exhibitions
 NYC – ClampArt, April 4–7
 Tokyo – RPS Gallery, May 1–9
 Rome – Officine Fotografiche, May 18–31
 New York Transit Museum – 7 Line Subway Exhibition (Summer 2017)
 Royal Photographic Society Touring Exhibition, United Kingdom
 Red: SE Center for Photography, Greenville, South Carolina, February 3–28

2018
 Built in the Hudson Valley, Calvert Vaux Preservation Alliance at Morton Memorial Library, Rhinecliff, New York, 2018
 Negative Space III Exhibition, Brooklyn Grain, New York City, 2018
 The Vernacular of Landscape Exhibition] Usagi Gallery, Brooklyn, New York, 2018
 So Far Exhibition, Landskrona Festival, 2018
 American Splendour: New Photography, Ilon Art Gallery, 2018

2019
 Rust Belt Biennial, Sordoni Gallery, Wilkes Barre, Pennsylvania, 2019 
 After Promontory: 150 Years of Transcontinental Railroading] BYU Art Museum, Provo, Utah, 2019

References

External links 
 

Living people
American photographers
1983 births